The Sun Odyssey 449 is a French sailboat that was designed by Philippe Briand as a cruiser and first built in 2015.

The design is a development of the Sun Odyssey 439 with a wider swimming platform and a bowsprit.

Production
The design was built by Jeanneau in France, from 2015 to 2019, but it is now out of production.

Design
The Sun Odyssey 449 is a recreational keelboat, built predominantly of polyester fiberglass, with wood trim. It has a fractional sloop rig, with a deck-stepped mast, two sets of swept spreaders and aluminum spars with 1X19 stainless steel wire rigging. The hull has a plumb stem, a reverse transom with a drop-down tailgate swimming platform, an internally mounted spade-type rudder controlled by dual wheels and a fixed "L"-shaped fin keel with a weighted bulb or optional shoal-draft keel. The fin keel model displaces  empty and carries  of cast iron ballast, while the shoal draft version displaces  and carries  of cast iron ballast.

The design has sleeping accommodation for six to eight people, with a double island berth in the bow cabin, a "U"-shaped settee and a straight settee with a navigation station in the main cabin and two aft cabins, each with a double berth. Alternatively the bow cabin can be fitted wit a "V"-berth and a smaller cabin with two offset bunk beds may be installed just aft of the bow cabin, on the port side. The galley is located on the starboard side just forward of the companionway ladder. The galley is "L"-shaped and is equipped with a two-burner stove, an ice box and a double sink. There are two heads, one just aft of the bow cabin on the starboard side and one on the port side, aft, opposite the galley.

See also
List of sailing boat types

References

External links

Keelboats
2010s sailboat type designs
Sailing yachts
Sailboat type designs by Philippe Briand
Sailboat types built by Jeanneau